Dulab Rural District is a rural district (dehestan) in the Shahab District of Qeshm County, Hormozgan Province, Iran. At the 2006 census, its population was 8,643, in 1,897 families.  The rural district has 13 villages.

References 

Rural Districts of Hormozgan Province
Qeshm County